Crompond is a hamlet and census-designated place (CDP) located in the town of Yorktown in Westchester County, New York, United States. The population was 2,292 at the 2010 census.

Geography
Crompond is located at  (41.289126, -73.834385).

The post office by the same name is approximately two miles west of the CDP, and is located in the Town of Cortlandt.

Demographics

At the 2000 census there were 2,050 people, 609 households, and 517 families living in the CDP. The population density was 824.7 per square mile (317.9/km). There were 623 housing units at an average density of 250.6/sq mi (96.6/km).  The racial makeup of the CDP was 91.76% White, 2.44% African American, 0.05% Native American, 4.24% Asian, 0.54% from other races, and 0.98% from two or more races. Hispanic or Latino of any race were 3.80%.

Of the 609 households 46.6% had children under the age of 18 living with them, 76.4% were married couples living together, 6.2% had a female householder with no husband present, and 15.1% were non-families. 12.8% of households were one person and 4.8% were one person aged 65 or older. The average household size was 3.00 and the average family size was 3.30.

The age distribution was 26.8% under the age of 18, 4.5% from 18 to 24, 25.9% from 25 to 44, 25.7% from 45 to 64, and 17.1% 65 or older. The median age was 41 years. For every 100 females, there were 89.5 males. For every 100 females age 18 and over, there were 82.9 males.

The median household income was $88,408 and the median family income  was $98,293. Males had a median income of $58,750 versus $41,842 for females. The per capita income for the CDP was $31,292. About 1.3% of families and 2.0% of the population were below the poverty line, including 1.3% of those under age 18 and none of those age 65 or over.

References

Census-designated places in New York (state)
Yorktown, New York